Maria Rautio (born 8 July 1957) is a Swedish cross-country skier. She competed in the women's 5 kilometres at the 1976 Winter Olympics.

Cross-country skiing results

Olympic Games

References

External links
 

1957 births
Living people
Swedish female cross-country skiers
Olympic cross-country skiers of Sweden
Cross-country skiers at the 1976 Winter Olympics
People from Pajala Municipality
20th-century Swedish women